Branny is a townland in County Tyrone, Northern Ireland. It is situated in the historic barony of Dungannon Lower and the civil parish of Carnteel and covers an area of 228 acres.

The name derives from the Irish: Brannaidh (pens or folds for sheep).

The population of the townland declined during the 19th century:

The townland contains one Scheduled Historic Monument: a hilltop enclosure (grid ref: H6826 5556).

See also
List of townlands of County Tyrone
List of archaeological sites in County Tyrone

References

Townlands of County Tyrone
Archaeological sites in County Tyrone
Civil parish of Carnteel